Okoč is a village and municipality in the Dunajská Streda District in the Trnava Region of south-west Slovakia.

Component villages
The municipality comprises the following villages and manors:

Demography 
In 1910, the village had 544, for the most part, Hungarian inhabitants. At the 2001 Census the recorded population of the village was 3804 while an end-2008 estimate by the Statistical Office had the village's population as 3794. As of 2001, 92.53% of its population were Hungarians while 6.07% were Slovaks. Roman Catholicism is the majority religion of the village, its adherents numbering 60.52% of the total population.

History
In historical records the village was first mentioned in 1268 by it Hungarian name as Ekech. The village was first recorded in 1468 as the estate of the Dóczy family. Until the end of World War I, it was part of Hungary and fell within the Csallóköz district of Komárom County. Until the end of the 19th century, villagers made their living by fishing on the Danube and the Small-Danube. After the Austro-Hungarian army disintegrated in November 1918, Czechoslovak troops occupied the area. After the Treaty of Trianon of 1920, the village became officially part of Czechoslovakia. In November 1938, the First Vienna Award granted the area to Hungary and it was held by Hungary until 1945. After Soviet occupation in 1945, Czechoslovak administration returned and the village became officially part of Czechoslovakia in 1947. The present municipality was formed in 1976 when Opatovský Sokolec (Apácaszakállas)  and Okoč (Ekecs) were unified following the merger of the respective agricultural co-operatives in 1973.

Geography
The municipality lies at an altitude of 112 metres and covers an area of 63.426 km².

Picture gallery 
 Okoč (Ekecs) 

Opatovský Sokolec (Apácaszakállas)

References

External links
Local news selection at www.parameter.hu 
Local election 2010 results by the Statistical Office of the Slovak Republic

Villages and municipalities in Dunajská Streda District
Hungarian communities in Slovakia